The following radio stations broadcast on AM frequency 1330 kHz: 1330 AM is a Regional broadcast frequency.

In Argentina
 LRI237 in Rosario, Santa Fe

In Canada

In Mexico
 XECSEZ-AM in Jalpa, Zacatecas
 XEEV-AM in Izúcar de Matamoros, Puebla

In the United States

In Uruguay
 CX 40 Radio Fénix in Montevideo

References

Lists of radio stations by frequency